Gutierrezia serotina is a North American species of flowering plant in the family Asteraceae known by the common name late snakeweed.

It is endemic to Arizona in the United States.

Description
Gutierrezia serotina is a perennial herb or subshrub up to 30 cm (1 foot) in height. Leaves are very narrow, sometimes thread-like.

At the end of each branch there is an inflorescence of one or a few flower heads. The heads are larger than for most of the species in the genus. The head contains 8-17 disc florets with 4-9 yellow ray florets around the edge.

References

External links
USDA Plants Profile for Gutierrezia serotina (late snakeweed)
Missouri Botanical Garden: photo of herbarium specimen collected in Arizona (1935) —  isotype of Gutierrezia serotina.

serotina
Flora of Arizona
Endemic flora of the United States
Plants described in 1899
Taxa named by Edward Lee Greene
Flora without expected TNC conservation status